The 1977 LPGA Tour was the 28th season since the LPGA Tour officially began in 1950. The season ran from February 11 to November 13. The season consisted of 32 official money events. Debbie Austin and Judy Rankin won the most tournaments, five each. Rankin led the money list with earnings of $122,890, becoming the first player to win $100,000 in a season.

There were six first-time winners in 1977: Debbie Austin, Silvia Bertolaccini, Vivian Brownlee, Bonnie Lauer, Debbie Massey, and Hollis Stacy.

The tournament results and award winners are listed below.

Tournament results
The following table shows all the official money events for the 1977 season. "Date" is the ending date of the tournament. The numbers in parentheses after the winners' names are the number of wins they had on the tour up to and including that event. Majors are shown in bold.

Awards

References

External links
LPGA Tour official site
1977 season coverage at golfobserver.com

LPGA Tour seasons
LPGA Tour